Gavin Reynolds (born 15 April 1979) is a former English cricketer.  Reynolds was a right-handed batsman who bowled right-arm medium pace.  He was born in Liverpool, Lancashire.

Reynolds represented the Lancashire Cricket Board in a single List A match against the Yorkshire Cricket Board in the 2001 Cheltenham & Gloucester Trophy.  In his only List A match, he scored 2 runs.  With the ball he took a single wicket at a cost of 28 runs.

References

External links
Gavin Reynolds at Cricinfo
Gavin Reynolds at CricketArchive

1979 births
Living people
Cricketers from Liverpool
English cricketers
Lancashire Cricket Board cricketers